is a former Japanese football player who lastly played for J1 League team Shimizu S-Pulse.

Career 
After graduating high school he entered the University of Tsukuba where he represented them at football. After graduation in 2005, he signed for Shimizu S-Pulse. Hyodo scored his first professional goal against Omiya Ardija in August of the same year.

After retiring at the end of 2018 season, he joined Shimizu S-Pulse as a scout in June 2019.

Club statistics
Updated to 23 December 2018.

1Includes Japanese Super Cup and J2 playoffs.

References

External links

Profile at Mito HollyHock 
Profile at Shimizu S-Pulse

1982 births
Living people
People from Shiroi
University of Tsukuba alumni
Association football people from Chiba Prefecture
Japanese footballers
J1 League players
J2 League players
Shimizu S-Pulse players
Kashiwa Reysol players
JEF United Chiba players
Oita Trinita players
Mito HollyHock players
Ventforet Kofu players
Association football midfielders
Universiade medalists in football
Universiade gold medalists for Japan